Jackie or Jacky may refer to:

People and fictional characters
 Jackie (given name), a list of people and fictional characters named Jackie or Jacky

 Jackie, current ring name of female professional wrestler Jacqueline Moore
 Jackie Lee (Irish singer) (born 1936), also known as "Jacky"
 Jarrhan Jacky (born 1989), Australian rules football player

Arts and entertainment

Films
 Jackie (1921 film), directed by John Ford
 Jacky (film), a 2000 Dutch film
 Jackie (2010 film), an Indian multilingual film directed by Kannada director Soori
 Jackie (2012 film), a Dutch film
 Jackie (2016 film), a biographical drama about Jackie Kennedy

Music

Albums
 Jackie (Jackie DeShannon album) (1972)
 Jackie (Ciara album) (2015)

Songs
 "Jacky" (Jacques Brel song) (1965)
 "Jackie" (Elisa Fiorillo song) (1987)
 "Jackie", a song from the 1987 album The Lion and the Cobra by Sinéad O'Connor
 “Jackie”, a song from the 1993 rap album KKKill the Fetus by Esham
 "Jackie", a song from the 2000 album Mass Romantic by The New Pornographers
 "Jacky", a 2000 song by To Rococo Rot
 "The Jackie", a 2021 song by Bas and J. Cole

Animals
 Jackie (dog), a Finnish dog, trained to mimic the Nazi salute, that caused a 1941 controversy
 Jackie (1922-1946), the second MGM Studio lion and the first to be heard roaring, used from 1928 to 1956.
 Jacky dragon (Amphibolurus muricatus), a lizard

Other uses
 Jackie (magazine), a British teen magazine

See also
 Jackie O (disambiguation)
 Jacqui, a similar given name